Featherstones were a small department store group in Kent.

History

In 1901 John Thomas Featherstone set up a store in Chatham High Street to supply goods to the public, with the novel idea of selling them on credit with no interest charged.

The store sold a large range of goods from a drapery department to coal. They were listed in early adverts as Universal Providers.

By the 1930s they had opened further branches in Rochester High Street; Bell Road Sittingbourne; The Broadway Sheerness; Palace Street Canterbury; Parrock Street Gravesend; Earl Street Maidstone. The business ran a club which shoppers could save their money with to buy goods.

During the 1970s Chris Featherstone, a member of the family raced sportscars, including Formula 5000.

The business continued to run until 1981, when the stores were closed and the business changed its focus onto property.

References

Defunct department stores of the United Kingdom
Defunct companies of England
Companies based in Kent
British companies established in 1901
Retail companies established in 1901
Retail companies disestablished in 1981
1901 establishments in England
1981 disestablishments in England
British companies disestablished in 1981